Crawford Manor, also the George W. Crawford House or George Crawford Towers, is a historic high-rise apartment building at 84-96 Park Street in New Haven, Connecticut.  Completed in 1966, the fifteen-story building is a significant mature work of architect Paul Rudolph, and a good local example of Brutalist architecture.  The building was listed on the National Register of Historic Places in 2015, and as a non-contributing element to the Dwight Street Historic District in 1983.  It is owned by the city of New Haven, which uses it for public housing.

Description and history
Crawford Manor is located on the western fringe of New Haven's downtown area, at the northwest corner of Park Street and MLK Jr. Boulevard.  It is set on a small parcel fringed with greenery on the street-facing sides, and parking and the access drive on the west and north sides.  The building is fifteen stories in height, with an irregular C-shaped footprint.  The building is built with a steel frame and concrete blocks, and is finished with a rusticated concrete finish.  Most architectural elements are consist along vertical orientations the entire height of the building, with rhythmic placement of porches (with either rounded or squared outsides), some of which project further than others.  Full-height windowless piers separate other visual elements, including windows and porches, from each other.  The interior is finished in a manner similar to the exterior, with ribbed rough concrete elements, and poured concrete floors and ceilings.  It now houses 109 units, either studio or single bedrooms.

Construction on Crawford Manor was begun in 1964, in order to address a well-documented shortage of public housing for needy senior citizens.  It was designed by Paul Rudolph, then the head of the Yale University School of Architecture, and a well-known advocate of what has since been called Brutalist architecture.  Originally designed as a thirteen-story building in 1962, it was enlarged due to increased demand.  When completed in 1966, the building was by far the largest senior housing facility in the city.  It was named in honor of George W. Crawford, the city's recently retired corporation council.

See also
National Register of Historic Places listings in New Haven, Connecticut

References

External links

Elm City Communities - George Crawford Manor

Residential buildings on the National Register of Historic Places in Connecticut
Brutalist architecture in Connecticut
Buildings and structures in New Haven, Connecticut
National Register of Historic Places in New Haven, Connecticut
Paul Rudolph buildings